Russell Taylor was a British journalist who was City editor of The Observer. He later worked for merchant bank Hambros, and in 1972 became chief executive of Italian International Bank. He was educated at Radley College.

Selected publications
Going for broke. Simon & Schuster, 1993.

References 

Year of birth missing
Year of death missing
British bankers
British chief executives
People educated at Radley College
British financial writers
British journalists
The Observer people